Moore Reservoir is an impoundment on the Connecticut River located in the communities of Littleton, New Hampshire; Dalton, New Hampshire; Waterford, Vermont; and Concord, Vermont.

It was created by the completion of the Moore Dam in 1956, which caused the flooding of several villages, including Pattenville, New Hampshire, and old Waterford, Vermont. Moore Dam is now owned and operated by TransCanada Corporation. With a capacity of 192 megawatts, it is the most productive of TransCanada's thirteen hydroelectric facilities in New England.

The lake is classified as a cold- and warmwater fishery, with observed species including brook trout, rainbow trout, brown trout, smallmouth and largemouth bass, chain pickerel, bullpout, northern pike, and rock bass.

See also

List of lakes in New Hampshire
List of lakes in Vermont

References

Reservoirs in New Hampshire
Reservoirs in Vermont
Concord, Vermont
Waterford, Vermont
Lakes of Coös County, New Hampshire
Lakes of Grafton County, New Hampshire
Protected areas of Caledonia County, Vermont
Protected areas of Essex County, Vermont
Protected areas of Coös County, New Hampshire
Lakes of Caledonia County, Vermont
Lakes of Essex County, Vermont
Littleton, New Hampshire